Stratified epithelial lining can refer to:
 Stratified squamous epithelium
 Stratified columnar epithelium
 Stratified cuboidal epithelium